Tanagra railway station is the railway station the serves the town of Schimatari and nearby Tanagra in Boeotia, Greece. It is situated just off the junction of the Piraeus–Platy railway and the branch line to Chalcis (Oinoi–Chalcis railway), however, neither of these services call at the station. It is owned by OSE, but services are provided by Hellenic Train, with Regional services. Today Hellenic Train operates just 4 daily Regional trains to Athens and Leianokladi. The station lies close to an airforce base.

History
The station opened in 2016. Despite its name, the station only serves the settlement of Schimatari.

Facilities
As of (2020) the station has waiting rooms and a staffed booking office. The station has a buffet, as well as toilets and parking. Taxi rank is also available, with platform shelters on the island platform.

Service
The station is served by Regional services to Athens and Leianokladi.

References

Transport in Boeotia
Railway stations in Central Greece
Railway stations opened in 2016
Buildings and structures in Boeotia